Subarna Naik is a politician from Odisha, India. He represented the Keonjhar (Vidhan Sabha constituency) during the years 2009 to 2014.

References

Odisha MLAs 2009–2014
People from Kendujhar district
Biju Janata Dal politicians
Living people
Year of birth missing (living people)